Riccardo Del Fra (born February 20, 1956, Rome) is an Italian jazz double-bassist, bandleader, composer, and arranger.

Del Fra first played guitar, then switched to upright bass when he was sixteen years old. He studied at a conservatory, played in the RAI Orchestra, and did work as a studio musician for film scores in the 1970s. Concomitantly, he began playing as a sideman in jazz venues in Rome for touring musicians, such as Art Blakey, Art Farmer, and Kai Winding. He joined Enrico Pieranunzi's ensemble in the late 1970s and played with Chet Baker; Del Fra and Baker played together frequently thereafter until Baker's death.

Del Fra eventually moved to Paris, where he worked in a trio setting with Alain Jean-Marie and Al Levitt and played local clubs as the backing band for visiting Americans. He also worked with Charles Loos, Barney Wilen, Lee Konitz, Joe Diorio, and Bob Brookmeyer in the 1980s and 1990s.

Discography
 Mr. B Chet Baker Trio (Timeless, 1983)
 Chet Baker Trio live at Ronnie Scott's (Jazzdor, 1986 and DVD, Wadham Film – Hendring, 1986)
 Chet Baker Sings Again Chet Baker Quartet (Timeless, 1986)
 La Note Bleue (IDA Records 1986) with Barney Wilen
 French Ballads (IDA Records, 1987) with Barney Wilen
 A Sip of Your Touch (IDA Records, 1989)
 Sorserez (1995) with Jacques Pellen
 Paris Suite Bob Brookmeyer New Quartet (Challenge, 1995) with Bob Brookmeyer
 Double Take (RAM Records 1998) with Joe Diorio
 Voulouz Loar – Velluto di Luna (GWP, 1998) with Annie Ebrel
 Soft Talk (Sketch, 2000) with Michel Graillier
 Overnight (Sketch, 2002) with John Taylor and Kenny Wheeler
 Empreintes (Sketch, 2003) with Bruno Angelini, Ichirō Onoe
 Roses and Roots (Nocturne, 2005) with Bruno Ruder, Sylvain Rifflet, Joey Baron 
 John Ruocco: Am I Asking Too Much (Pirouet, 2008) with John Taylor
 Sky Changes (Jazzheads, 2012) with Dave Liebman, Benjamin von Gutzeit, Manhattan School of Music Chamber Jazz Ensemble & Tactus
 My Chet My Song (Cristal Records, 2014) with Airelle Besson, Pierrick Pedron, Bruno Ruder, Billy Hart
 Moving People (Cristal Records, 2018) with Kurt Rosenwinkel, Tomasz Dąbrowski, Jan Prax, Rémi Fox, Carl-Henri Morisset, Jason Brown
 Chet Visions (Cristal, 2019)

References

External links

Musicians from Rome
Italian jazz double-bassists
Italian composers
Timeless Records artists
Challenge Records artists